The 1998 Jacksonville State Gamecocks football team represented Jacksonville State University as a member of the Southland Football League during the 1998 NCAA Division I-AA football season. Led by second-year head coach Mike Williams, the Gamecocks compiled an overall record of 7–4 with a mark of 4–3 in conference play, placing fourth in the Southland. Jacksonville State played home games at Paul Snow Stadium in Jacksonville, Alabama.

Schedule

References

Jacksonville State
Jacksonville State Gamecocks football seasons
Jacksonville State Gamecocks football